The Mayu is a river in Rakhine State, Myanmar (Burma). The river and its surrounding region, known as the Mayu region or Mayu peninsula, is named after the nearby Mayu Mountain. It was formerly known as the Manlayuwaddy River. It is the third most used river in Rakhine State, and is 96 miles (154 kilometers) long and drains into the Bay of Bengal, near Sittwe. It passes through Buthidaung, Rathedaung and Sittwe Township.

References

Rivers of Myanmar
Bay of Bengal
Rakhine State
Sittwe